Anglo-Indian Canadians are Canadian citizens of Anglo-Indian heritage. Many Anglo-Indian Canadians have roots in the Indian subcontinent. Some of the earlier generations of Indians have British Indian heritage.

History
Indians from the subcontinent have migrated overseas to many countries such as South Africa, Great Britain, Oceania, Caribbean, North America, and South East Asia due to political conflicts, economic opportunities, education and search of a better life. Indian migration to Canada recently is due to economic opportunities as well as education.

Notable Anglo-Indian Canadians
 George Marthins (1905 – 1989), Indian field hockey player, 1928 Olympian, emigrated to Canada
 Russell Peters (born 1970), Canadian comedian
 Joseph Harris (born 1965), Indian-born Canadian cricketer
 Boris Karloff (born 1887, died 1969), British-Canadian actor

References

External links
 Canadians of Anglo-Indian ethnicity
 Anglo-Indian Website

 
Ethnic groups in Canada